Emil Belluš (19 September 1899 – 14 December 1979) was a Slovak functionalist architect.

Career
Emil Belluš began his studies at the Technical University in Budapest in 1918, but completed them at the Czech Technical University in Prague in 1923. He then returned to Slovakia where he became a founding member of the Association of Slovak Artists (later the Slovak Architects Society, of which he was president 1945–1953) and of the Slovak Rowing Club. He designed the clubhouse for the rowing club.

While working in an international functionalist style, he was willing to modify it with classical elements, as can be seen in the Colonnade Bridge at Piešťany completed in 1932.

His design for the head office of the Slovak National Bank (1938) showed the influence of Italian Rationalism.

The annual architectural award of the Slovak Architects Society is named the Emil Belluš Prize in his memory.

Buildings
 National House, Banská Bystrica (1925)
 Flour Mill, Trnava (1936)
 Slovak National Bank, Bratislava (1938)
 Trnava Water-Works (1946)

Works on Belluš
 Martin Kusý, Emil Belluš. Bratislava: Tatran, 1984.
 Emil Belluš: Architektonické dielo, exhibition catalogue. Bratislava: Slovak National Gallery, 1989.
 Architekt Emil Belluš, regionálna moderna, exhibition catalogue. Bratislava: Spolok architektov Slovenska (Slovak Architects Society), 1992.

References

1899 births
1979 deaths
Slovak architects
Czech Technical University in Prague alumni
People from Banská Bystrica District